Bernard Joseph Nolker, C.Ss.R. (September 25, 1912 – January 17, 2000) was an American member of the Congregation of the Most Holy Redeemer, commonly known as the Redemptorists, who served as a missionary in Brazil for 45 years. He was named the first Bishop of the Diocese of Paranaguá in 1963.

Biography
Nolker was born in Baltimore, Maryland, and grew up in the Wyman Park section of North Baltimore. As a teenager, he was educated at the Redemptorist minor seminary in North East, Pennsylvania, after which he was admitted to the congregation at their novitiate in Ilchester, Maryland, where he professed religious vows as a Redemptorist.  He studied for the Catholic priesthood at Mount St. Alphonsus Seminary in Esopus, New York, where he was ordained on June 18, 1939.   

Nolker had been serving as a missionary in Brazil since 1941, when Pope John XXIII named him on January 7, 1963, to be the first bishop of the newly-created Diocese of Paranaguá.  He was consecrated a bishop by Lawrence Joseph Shehan, the Archbishop of Baltimore, on the following April 25.  The co-consecrators were Manoel da Silveira d’Elboux, Archbishop of Curitiba, and Edward John Harper, C.Ss.R., the Bishop of Saint Thomas. As a bishop, he attended sessions two, three and four of the Second Vatican Council and was then responsible for initiating the Council's reforms in the new diocese. 

The Diocese of Paranaguá is located in southeastern Brazil and the region contains semitropical forests, mountains and a maritime region.  In order to reach certain areas of the diocese, Nolker had to travel by horseback or a jeep. He served the diocese as its bishop for 26 years before Pope John Paul II accepted his resignation on March 15, 1989, and he was given the title of  bishop emeritus. 

Nolker died of heart failure at St. John Neumann Residence in Saratoga Springs, New York, at the age of 87.

See also

References

1912 births
2000 deaths
Religious leaders from Baltimore
Mount St. Alphonsus Seminary alumni
Redemptorist bishops
20th-century Roman Catholic bishops in Brazil
Participants in the Second Vatican Council
Roman Catholic missionaries in Brazil
American expatriates in Brazil
Roman Catholic bishops of Paranaguá